The sixth season of Australia's Next Top Model premiered on 20 July 2010 on Fox8. Sarah Murdoch returned as the host and leading judge for this season. Alex Perry and Charlotte Dawson also returned as judges.

The prizes for this season included a one-year modelling contract with Priscilla's Model Management, a 25,000 contract to be the face Levi’s, a trip to New York to meet with Elite Model Management, a brand new Ford Fiesta Zetec, an eight-page editorial spread and the cover of Harper's Bazaar Australia, and 20,000 courtesy of U by Kotex.

The winner of the competition was 17-year-old Amanda Ware from Mermaid Beach, Queensland.

Series summary
A few major changes were made this season. Jez Smith returned as part of the judging panel for the first time since the third season, and Jonathan Pease was replaced by fashion icon Josh Flinn, due to the former's work conflicts. Filming took place from May through June 2010. The number of contestants this season was increased from 13 to 16. The model house was located on 21 Hunter St, in Sydney's eastern suburb of Dover Heights. In contrast to the previous three seasons, the viewer vote entirely determined the winner and placements of each contestant during the live finale. Beginning this season, there was also a shift in the series' tone, with less focus being placed on quarrels among the contestants.

Requirements
All contestants had to be aged 16 or over in order to apply for the show. To qualify, all applicants had to be an Australian citizen currently living in Australia. Additional requirements stated that a contestant could not have had previous experience as a model in a national campaign within the last five years, and if a contestant was represented by an agent or a manager, she had to terminate that representation before the competition.

Auditions
Auditions were held on 16–17 January in Sydney, on 19–20 January in Brisbane, on 21 January in Bendigo, on 23 January in Adelaide and on 24 January in Perth.

Cast

Contestants

(Ages stated are at start of contest)

Judges
Sarah Murdoch (host)
Alex Perry
Charlotte Dawson
Jez Smith

Other cast members
Josh Flinn – style director, model mentor

Episodes

Results

 The contestant was eliminated
 The contestant was part of a non-elimination bottom two
  The contestant won the competition

Average call-out order
Final two is not included.

Bottom two

 The contestant was eliminated after her first time in the bottom two/three
 The contestant was eliminated after her second time in the bottom two/three
 The contestant was eliminated after her third time in the bottom two/three 
 The contestant was eliminated after her fourth time in the bottom two/three
 The contestant was eliminated in the final judging and placed third
 The contestant was eliminated in the final judging and placed as the runner-up

Controversy
Due to an error during the live finale broadcast, Kelsey Martinovich was initially announced as the winner. Consequently, she won several prizes usually reserved for the winner; including a 25,000 cash prize, an all expenses paid trip to New York to meet with potential modeling agents and a dulled cover and spread in Harper's Bazaar Australia. The magazine decided to split the cover of the November issue, printing half featuring Amanda on the cover and the other featuring Kelsey.

In the days following the airing of the live final, the show was accused of feigning the botched announcement as a publicity stunt. Concerning accusations targeted toward Sarah Murdoch, judge Alex Perry commented: "There's no way that she would do that. I think you saw that the instant that she knew something was wrong, you could see it in her eyes, that wasn't lying, that wasn't acting. Everybody wants to tag something sinister on it and say it was done for ratings (but) I know Sarah and I know the executive producer, it's just not their style, they have too much integrity"

Sarah Murdoch later made an appearance with the finalists for an exclusive interview on A Current Affair, in which she went into detail over the incident. In it, Murdoch expressed her dismay: "I still feel sick about it, I mean, I'm still in shock about it. We'd had such a brilliant show, and amazing series to begin with, a fantastic live show, and in the last minute everything went wrong." When questioned about the stunt accusations and accurate vote count, Murdoch affirmed that everything had gone as intended, and it had simply been a miscommunication.

Notes

References

External links
 Official website (archive at the Wayback Machine)

2010 Australian television seasons
Australia's Next Top Model seasons
Television shows filmed in Australia
Television shows filmed in Japan